"Be There With You" is a song by Human Nature, released as the fifth and final single from their album second studio album Counting Down (1999). The song peaked at No. 40 in Australia.

Track listing
CD single (667424.2)
 "Be There With You" (Radio Version) - 3:53
 "Be There With You" (Patric Berger Mix) - 3:58
 "Be There With You" (Trouser Enthusiasts' Electric Ecstasy Mix) - 4:36
 "Counting Down" (Acoustic) - 3:25
 "Earth Angel" (Live Version) - 6:08
 VIDEO "Don't Cry"	

 Track 5 originally released on "Happy Days, The Arena Mega Musical".

Charts

Weekly charts

External links

References

2000 singles
Human Nature (band) songs
1998 songs
Sony Music Australia singles
Songs written by Paul Begaud
Songs written by Andrew Tierney
Songs written by Michael Tierney (musician)
Pop ballads